Saint Lawrence is an unincorporated community in Glasscock County, Texas, United States.  It lies south of Garden City, the county seat of Glasscock County.  Its elevation is 2,677 feet (816 m).

References

Unincorporated communities in Glasscock County, Texas
Unincorporated communities in Texas